Religion in Antigua and Barbuda consists of the religious beliefs practices of people living in Antigua and Barbuda, as well as their history. The majority of the population of Antigua and Barbuda is Christian, and religious freedom is generally respected in the country, although Rastafarians face some obstacles to religious practice.

Demographics 
According to the 2001 census, which has the most reliable figures available, 74 percent of the population of Antigua and Barbuda is Christian. The Anglican Church is the largest religious denomination, accounting for an estimated 26 percent of the population. The Roman Catholic, Pentecostal churches, Moravian, Methodist and Seventh-day Adventist Church account for less than 10 percent each.
 The United Evangelical Association, an organization that includes most independent evangelical churches, claims an estimated 25 percent of the population, and Jehovah's Witnesses number more than 1,000 members. The total number of non-Christians is small; they include an estimated 1,000 to 1,500 Rastafarians, more than 200 Muslims, nearly 200 Hindus, about 30 Jews, and approximately 50 members of the Baháʼí Faith. There are more than 4,000 atheists or persons who do not follow a particular religion.  The Church of Jesus Christ of Latter-day Saints claims 161 members as of year-end 2007. 7.68% of people in the Parish of Saint Peter answered "None/no religion" on the 2011 Population and Housing Census, the highest percentage in the country, while the lowest percentage in the country is in the Parish of Saint Philip, with 3.65% answering "None/no religion".

Religious freedom 
The constitution of Antigua and Barbuda establishes the freedom of religious belief in the country. Members of clergy are not allowed to run for political office.

Representatives of the Rastafari community have complained that legal restrictions such as the criminalization of cannabis and mandatory vaccination policies are contrary to their religious beliefs, although the government is also reportedly working with the community to reach a compromise on these issues.

See also
Hinduism in Antigua and Barbuda
Islam in Antigua and Barbuda

References